Illumos (stylized as illumos) is a partly free and open-source Unix operating system. It is based on OpenSolaris, which was based on System V Release 4 (SVR4) and the Berkeley Software Distribution (BSD). Illumos comprises a kernel, device drivers, system libraries, and utility software for system administration. This core is now the base for many different open-sourced illumos distributions, in a similar way in which the Linux kernel is used in different Linux distributions.

The maintainers write illumos in lowercase since some computer fonts do not clearly distinguish a lowercase L from an uppercase i: Il (see homoglyph). The project name is a combination of words illuminare from Latin for to light and OS for Operating System.

Overview 

Illumos was announced via webinar on Thursday, 3 August 2010, as a community effort of some core Solaris engineers to create a truly open source Solaris by swapping closed source bits of OpenSolaris with open implementations.

The original plan explicitly stated that illumos would not be a distribution or a fork. However, after Oracle announced discontinuing OpenSolaris, plans were made to fork the final version of the Solaris ON kernel allowing illumos to evolve into a kernel of its own.

, efforts focused on libc, the NFS lock manager, the crypto module, and many device drivers to create a Solaris-like OS with no closed, proprietary code. , development emphasis includes transitioning from the historical compiler, Studio, to GCC. The "userland" software is now built with GNU make and contains many GNU utilities such as GNU tar.

Illumos is lightly led by founder Garrett D'Amore and other community members/developers such as Bryan Cantrill and Adam Leventhal, via a Developers' Council.

The Illumos Foundation has been incorporated in the State of California as a 501(c)6 trade association, with founding board members Jason Hoffman (formerly at Joyent), Evan Powell (Nexenta), and Garrett D'Amore. As of August 2012, the foundation was in the process of formalizing its by-laws and organizational development.

At OpenStorage Summit 2010, the new logo for illumos was revealed, with official type and branding to follow over.

Development 
Its primary development project, illumos-gate, derives from OS/Net (aka ON), which is a Solaris kernel with the bulk of the drivers, core libraries, and basic utilities, similar to what is delivered by a BSD "src" tree. It was originally dependent on OpenSolaris OS/Net, but a fork was made after Oracle silently decided to close the development of Solaris and unofficially killed the OpenSolaris project.

Features 
 ZFS, a combined file system and logical volume manager providing a high level of data integrity for very large storage capacities.
 Solaris Containers (or Zones), a low overhead implementation of operating-system-level virtualization technology for x86 and SPARC systems.
 DTrace, a comprehensive dynamic tracing framework for troubleshooting kernel and application problems on production systems in real time.
 Kernel-based Virtual Machine (KVM), a virtualization infrastructure. KVM supports native virtualization on processors with hardware virtualization extensions.
 OpenSolaris Network Virtualization and Resource Control (or Crossbow), a set of features that provides an internal network virtualization and quality of service including: virtual NIC (VNIC) pseudo-network interface technology, exclusive ip zones, bandwidth management, and flow control on a per interface and per VNIC basis.

Current distributions 

Distributions, at illumos.org
 DilOS, with Debian package manager (dpkg +  apt) and virtualization support, available for x86-64 and SPARC.
 NexentaStor, distribution optimized for virtualization, storage area networks, network-attached storage, and iSCSI or Fibre Channel applications employing the ZFS file system.
 OmniOS Community Edition, takes a minimalist approach suitable for server use.
 OpenIndiana, a distribution that is a continuation and fork in the spirit of the OpenSolaris operating system.
 SmartOS, a distribution for cloud computing with Kernel-based Virtual Machine integration.
 Tribblix, retro style distribution with modern components, available for x86-64 and SPARC.
 v9os, a server-only, IPS-based minimal SPARC distribution.
 XStreamOS, a distribution for infrastructure, cloud, and web development.
Discontinued:
 Dyson, derived from Debian using libc, and SMF init system.
 OpenSXCE, distribution for developers and system administrators for IA-32/x86-64 x86 platforms and SPARC.

See also 
 Solaris, a relative of Illumos

References

External links
 
 napp-it, a ZFS web interface for Illumos-based NAS or SAN appliances.

Free software
OpenSolaris
Software forks
Solaris software

de:OpenSolaris#illumos